Warren B. Wilson (November 4, 1920 - December 1, 1997) was an American educator, painter, sculptor, and potter. He was a professor of art at Brigham Young University for nearly three decades.

Life
Wilson was born in Farmington, Utah. He graduated from Utah State University in 1943, served in the United States Air Force during World War II from 1943 to 1945, and earned a master's degree in Fine Arts from the University of Iowa in 1949.

Wilson first taught art at his alma mater, Utah State University, for 5 years. He subsequently joined the faculty at Brigham Young University, where he taught for 29 years. Wilson was also a painter, sculptor, and potter.

Wilson married Donna Myrl Van Wagenen, and they had seven children. A member of the Church of Jesus Christ of Latter-day Saints, he served as a missionary in Nauvoo, Illinois with his wife in 1985. He died on December 1, 1997, and he was buried in the Provo City Cemetery.

References

1920 births
1997 deaths
People from Farmington, Utah
Utah State University alumni
University of Iowa alumni
Utah State University faculty
Brigham Young University faculty
American male painters
Painters from Utah
American male sculptors
American potters
Sculptors from Utah
20th-century American painters
20th-century American sculptors
20th-century male artists